The 1977 Speedway World Pairs Championship was the eighth FIM Speedway World Pairs Championship. The final took place in Manchester, England and was sponsored by Kawasaki. The championship was won by host England (28 points) who beat Sweden and West Germany (both 18 points).

Semifinal 1
  Lonigo
 June 12

Semifinal 2
  Pocking
 June 12

World final
  Manchester, Hyde Road
 July 2

See also
 1977 Individual Speedway World Championship
 1977 Speedway World Team Cup
 motorcycle speedway
 1977 in sports

References

1977
World Pairs
July 1977 sports events in the United Kingdom
International sports competitions in Manchester